Isolarii, stylized as isolarii, is an avant-garde media company founded by Sebastian Clark with India Ennenga. Launched in September 2020, the company is known for its array of international writers and political activity as well as the palm-sized format of its books. In 2022, it published "The War Diary of Yevgenia Belorusets."

History
Its name originates from the Venetian tradition of 'island books.' Clark was first inspired to launch the company in 2013, when a friend sent him René Daumal’s book Mount Analogue, while working at a smartphone factory in China.

In October 2020, Isolarii published F Letter: New Russian Feminist Poetry, which became a symbol for anti-government protests in Russia. 

Isolarii released Street Cop by Robert Coover and Art Spiegelman as a response to the United States Capitol attack in 2021. The New York Times described it as a “palm-sized lark” and Michael Silverblatt called it “a secret book.” 

In March 2022, "The War Diary of Yevgenia Belorusets," the company's daily dispatch from Kyiv at 4 pm, garnered international attention, with support from Margaret Atwood and Nan Goldin. It was adapted into a podcast episode for This American Life and, on March 3, 2023, inspired a statement by German Chancellor Olaf Scholz announcing changes to Germany's military support for Ukraine.

Critical response

Dominick Ammirati wrote in Artforum that “the press has succeeded at imbuing the book form with the psychophysical qualities of a mala, a rosary, kombolói, a smartphone—objects that you pick up and feel almost anxious letting go of.” 

Isolarii has been compared to Hanuman Books and described by Hans Ulrich Obrist as an “ingenious book club.”

Books

 In The Face of War: Ukraine 2022 by Yevgenia Belorusets, Nikita Kadan and Lesia Khomenko
 The Archipelago Conversations by Édouard Glissant and Hans Ulrich Obrist
 Modern Animal by Yevgenia Belorusets
 Street Cop by Robert Coover and Art Spiegelman
 Purple Perilla by Can Xue 
 F Letter: New Russian Feminist Poetry, ed. Galina Rymbu, Eugene Ostashevsky, and Ainsley Morse
 Salmon: A Red Herring by Cooking Sections

References 

Publishing companies established in 2020